Dorcadion divisum is a species of beetle in the family Cerambycidae. It was described by Ernst Friedrich Germar in 1839. It is known from Greece and Turkey.

Subspecies
 Dorcadion divisum bleusei Pic, 1899
 Dorcadion divisum chioticum Breuning, 1946
 Dorcadion divisum dissimile Ganglbauer, 1883
 Dorcadion divisum divisum Germar, 1839
 Dorcadion divisum loratum Thomson, 1867
 Dorcadion divisum mytilinense Kraatz, 1873
 Dorcadion divisum parteinterruptum Breuning, 1962
 Dorcadion divisum subdivisum Breuning, 1955

References

divisum
Beetles described in 1839